Sonny Roberts (1932 – March 17, 2021), often known as Sonny Orbitone, was a Jamaican record producer who had success within the British reggae market in the 1960s, 1970s and 1980s with his Planetone and Orbitone record labels.

Born in 1932 in Spice Grove, Manchester Parish, Roberts, who was originally a carpenter, emigrated to London in 1958. In 1961, he set up a recording studio in the basement of 108 Cambridge Road (a property owned by future Trojan Records founder Lee Gopthal), the first in Britain owned by a Jamaican. He started the Planetone label the following year (and later the Sway label), sharing premises with Island Records which provided distribution for the label, releasing ska records by artists such as Rico Rodriguez and also gospel records. The studio and record label operated until the late 1960s. He also cut acetates, which he supplied to local sound systems.

In the mid-1970s, he opened a record shop in Harlesden and started the Orbitone label, which was one of the key lovers rock labels, with releases by artists such as Tim Chandell, Judy Boucher and Joyce Bond, as well as releasing Nigerian music.

Roberts also ran the Love Vendor sound system.

In 1987, his production of Judy Boucher's "Can't Be with You Tonight" reached number two in the UK Singles Chart.

He returned to Jamaica in 1997, living in Saint Andrew Parish, where he ran a company producing natural colouring and seasoning products.

Roberts died in Saint Andrew of throat cancer on 17 March 2021, aged 89.

References

1932 births
2021 deaths
People from Manchester Parish
Jamaican record producers
Migrants from British Jamaica to the United Kingdom